Dell MediaDirect is a software application that is published by Dell, Inc. and is pre-installed on the computers they sell.  It attempts to provide DVD and CD playback and recent editions include features such as an address book and calendar.  It is a custom version of CyberLink PowerCinema developed and licensed to Dell by CyberLink.  MediaDirect works in conjunction with the operating system and the Dell QuickSet application.

Design controversy

Earlier versions of MediaDirect attracted criticism since they adopt a distinctive combination of BIOS and hard drive layout to bypass the installed OS and boot directly to the media player application using a single button press.

The chosen approach causes disk geometry to be deliberately misreported, can prevent the successful backup of hard disks and may trigger catastrophic data loss when MediaDirect is launched.

Unless the drive and all pre-existing operating systems are left as originally installed, MediaDirect can trigger a forced repartitioning of the drive whilst attempting to load. This intervention typically causes the loss of all operating systems and data on the device. Removing or disabling the application is challenging because Dell employs Host protected area technology to cloak the location of the partition containing the software, contributing to the misreported disk geometry.

Versions

Version 4
Version 4 deletes the dual-boot "fast start" capability and associated disk partition.  It is now installed as a standard application.  MediaDirect 4 includes optimisations for multi-media playback and is primarily used to support Blu-ray drives.

Version 3
Version 3.5 is compatible with Microsoft Windows XP and Vista (it also works on Windows 7 and Windows 8.1).
Each version has separate editions that can only be installed on certain computer models. This is achieved by using folder and file names in the installation software that matches the BIOS SystemID.

 XPS M1330
 XPS M1530
 MXG071 - XPSM1730

Version 3.3 is compatible with Microsoft Windows XP and Vista (it also works on Windows 7 and Windows 8.1).
Each version has separate editions that can only be installed on certain computer models. This is achieved by using folder and file names in the installation software that matches the BIOS SystemID.

 MXC061 - Inspiron 640M
 MM061 - Inspiron 6400/E1505
 MP061 - Inspiron 9400/E1705
 MXC062 - XPS M1210
 MXG061 - XPS M1710
 MXP061 - XPS M2010

Version 3 has a dual-boot option where the software can utilize a minimal load of the operating system which speeds boot time and simplifies operation.

Version 1.1
Released Sep. 1, 2005, is compatible with Microsoft Windows XP and the following Dell systems:
 Inspiron 6000
 XPS/Inspiron XPS Gen 2
 Inspiron 9300
 XPS/Inspiron M170
 Inspiron 1720

More information
 Understanding the Dell Media Direct Partition
 Dell Media Direct Destroys Partitions?, Dell Direct Media Nuked my System
 Dell MediaDirect 4.0 Frequently Asked Questions (FAQ)
 How to Reinstall MediaDirect 3.0 or 3.3
  How to Install Dell MediaDirect 2.0
 Download / How to Install MediaDirect 1.1
 CyberLink PowerCinema Linux

References

External links
 Dell MediaDirect 1.1 website

Dell products
Windows media players